Tussle is an American four-piece band from San Francisco, United States, formed in 2001 by Nathan Burazer, Jonathan Holland, Alexis Georgopoulos and Andy Cabic. The band released its first album, Kling Klang, in 2004 on Troubleman Unlimited. Their fourth album, Tempest was released in September 2012.

Discography
 Frisco Styles, compilation (Jack Hanley/Rainbow Records), (2003)
 "Eye Contact", 12" (Troubleman Unlimited), (2003)
 Don't Stop, EP (Troubleman Unlimited), (2004)
 Kling Klang (Troubleman Unlimited), 2004
 "Here It Comes", 12" (Troubleman Unlimited), (2005)
 "Disco d'Oro", 12" (Rong Music), (2005)
 "Disco d'Oro II", 12" (Rong Music), (2005)
 "I Am an Indian Too", 12" (Rong), (2005)
 Telescope Mind (Smalltown Supersound), (2006)
 "White Columns", 12" (White Columns Gallery), (2006)
 "Warning", 12" (Smalltown Supersound), (2007)
 Worried Noodles, compilation (Tomlab), (2007)
 "Meh-Teh", 7" (Tomlab), (2007)
 Notwave Compilation (Rong/DFA), (2008)
 "Notwave Sampler", 12" (Rong/DFA), (2008)
 "Animal Cop", 7" (Geographic North), (2008)
 Cream Cuts (Smalltown Supersound), (2008)
 Colett Xpress, compilation (Colett Express), (2008)
 "Titan", 12" (FrequeNC), (2009)
 Tussle / AM444, Split Ends, 12" (Smalltown Supersound / Pause Music / Genjing Records / Uptown Records), (2012)
 Tempest (Smalltown Supersound), (2012)

References

External links
 Tussle's official website
  77 Boadrum Site Profile Viva Radio, September 2007. (Flash)

Musical groups established in 2001
Musical groups from San Francisco
American freestyle music groups
Smalltown Supersound artists